Earnest Williams was an African-American man who was lynched by a mob in Parkdale, Ashley County, Arkansas, in 1908. John R. Steelman, who wrote his PhD dissertation on "mob action in the South", listed Williams as one of the cases, and said "Earnest Williams was thrust into eternity by a band of men who were 'outraged' at him for 'using offensive language'."

References

External links

1908 in Arkansas
1927 murders in the United States
History of Ashley County, Arkansas
Lynching deaths in Arkansas
Murdered African-American people
People murdered in Arkansas
Race-related controversies in the United States
Racially motivated violence against African Americans